The Dalles 38C is an Ojibway First Nation reserve in Kenora District, and is the main reserve of the Niisaachewan Anishinaabe Nation.

References

Anishinaabe reserves in Ontario
Communities in Kenora District